Strictly Personal is a 1933 American pre-Code drama film directed by Ralph Murphy, written by Beatrice Banyard, Willard Mack, Wilson Mizner, Casey Robinson and Robert T. Shannon, and starring Marjorie Rambeau, Dorothy Jordan, Eddie Quillan, Edward Ellis, Louis Calhern, Dorothy Burgess and Rollo Lloyd. It was released on March 17, 1933, by Paramount Pictures.

Plot

Cast 
Marjorie Rambeau as Annie Gibson
Dorothy Jordan as Mary
Eddie Quillan as Andy
Edward Ellis as Soapy Gibson
Louis Calhern as Magruder
Dorothy Burgess as Bessie
Rollo Lloyd as Jerry O'Connor
Olive Tell as Mrs. Castleman
Hugh Herbert as Wetzel
Thomas E. Jackson as Flynn
DeWitt Jennings as	Captain Reardon
Jean Laverty as Hope Jennings
Charles Sellon as Hewes
Ben Hall as Holbrook
Gay Seabrook as Giggles
Harvey Clark as Biddleberry
Helen Jerome Eddy as Mrs. Lovett

References

External links
 

1933 films
American drama films
1933 drama films
Paramount Pictures films
Films directed by Ralph Murphy
American black-and-white films
1930s English-language films
1930s American films